A data set (or dataset) is a collection of data. In the case of tabular data, a data set corresponds to one or more database tables, where every column of a table represents a particular variable, and each row corresponds to a given record of the data set in question. The data set lists values for each of the variables, such as for example height and weight of an object, for each member of the data set.  Data sets can also consist of a collection of documents or files.

In the open data discipline, data set is the unit to measure the information released in a public open data repository.  The European data.europa.eu portal aggregates more than a million data sets.  Some other issues (real-time data sources, non-relational data sets, etc.) increases the difficulty to reach a consensus about it.

Properties
Several characteristics define a data set's structure and properties.  These include the number and types of the attributes or variables, and various statistical measures applicable to them, such as standard deviation and kurtosis.

The values may be numbers, such as real numbers or integers, for example representing a person's height in centimeters, but may also be nominal data (i.e., not consisting of numerical values), for example representing a person's ethnicity. More generally, values may be of any of the kinds described as a level of measurement. For each variable, the values are normally all of the same kind. However, there may also be missing values, which must be indicated in some way.

In statistics, data sets usually come from actual observations obtained by sampling a statistical population, and each row corresponds to the observations on one element of that population. Data sets may further be generated by algorithms for the purpose of testing certain kinds of software.  Some modern statistical analysis software such as SPSS still present their data in the classical data set fashion.  If data is missing or suspicious an imputation method may be used to complete a data set.

Classic data sets 
Several classic data sets have been used extensively in the statistical literature:

 Iris flower data set – Multivariate data set introduced by Ronald Fisher (1936).
 MNIST database – Images of handwritten digits commonly used to test classification, clustering, and image processing algorithms
 Categorical data analysis – Data sets used in the book, An Introduction to Categorical Data Analysis.
Robust statistics – Data sets used in Robust Regression and Outlier Detection (Rousseeuw and Leroy, 1968). Provided on-line at the University of Cologne.
Time series – Data used in Chatfield's book, The Analysis of Time Series, are provided on-line by StatLib.
Extreme values – Data used in the book, An Introduction to the Statistical Modeling of Extreme Values are a snapshot of the data as it was provided on-line by Stuart Coles, the book's author.
Bayesian Data Analysis – Data used in the book are provided on-line by Andrew Gelman, one of the book's authors.
 The Bupa liver data – Used in several papers in the machine learning (data mining) literature.
 Anscombe's quartet – Small data set illustrating the importance of graphing the data to avoid statistical fallacies

See also 

 Data
 Data blending
 Data (computing)
 Data samples
 Data store
 Interoperability
 Data collection system
 List of datasets for machine-learning research

References

External links 

 Data.gov – the U.S. Government's open data
 GCMD – the Global Change Master Directory containing over 34,000 descriptions of Earth science and environmental science data sets and services
 Humanitarian Data Exchange(HDX) – The Humanitarian Data Exchange (HDX) is an open humanitarian data sharing platform managed by the United Nations Office for the Coordination of Humanitarian Affairs.
 NYC Open Data – free public data published by New York City agencies and other partners.
 Relational data set repository
 Research Pipeline – a wiki/website with links to data sets on many different topics
 StatLib–JASA Data Archive
 UCI – a machine learning repository
 UK Government Public Data
 World Bank Open Data – Free and open access to global development data by World Bank

Computer data
Statistical data sets